The 2016 Boodles Challenge was an exhibition tournament held before Wimbledon to serve as a warm-up to players. Taking place from 21 to 25 June 2016 at Stoke Park in London, it was the 15th edition of the Boodles Challenge. As with last year, no player was declared champion.

Results

Day 1 (21 June)

Day 2 (22 June)

Day 3 (23 June)

Due to inclement weather, Novak Djokovic decided to withdraw from the tournament and arrived to the 2016 Wimbledon Championships. Two scheduled matches were not played, also due to rain.

Day 4 (24 June)

Day 5 (25 June)

References

Boodles Challenge
Boodles Challenge
Boodles Challenge
Boodles Challenge
Boodles Challenge